Stephen Kwabena Siaw (born on the 1st of April, 1986), known by his stage name Ayesem, is a Ghanaian hip hop and hiplife recording artist from Takoradi. He is well known for his hit single, "Koti".

Early life and education 
Ayesem was born and raised in Takoradi, in the Western Region of Ghana. He is the second of three children. He attended Ghana Secondary Technical School, where he completed his Senior Secondary education. Ayesem proceeded to study Purchasing and Supply at the Takoradi Polytechnic, graduating with a Higher National Diploma in 2013.

Music career 
He started his career as a member of the group 'Trinity' in 2006. He later formed a music group called '2Unit' with fellow musician, Nero X. As a group, their songs received massive radio airplay in the Western and Central Region of Ghana.

Ayesem has had major collaborations with artists such as Castro, Old Solja, Kurl Songx, Kofi Kinaata, Epixode, Singlet, etc. Ayesem is currently signed to Shocks Entertainment. He has also worked with producers such as WillsBeatz and Ivan Beatz.

Videography

Awards and nominations

Discography

Singles

References

External links 

 
 

1986 births
Living people
People from Western Region (Ghana)
21st-century Ghanaian male singers
21st-century Ghanaian singers
Ghanaian rappers
Ghanaian hip hop musicians
Takoradi Technical University alumni
Ghanaian musicians